Linda Wild won in the final 6–4, 6–2 against Sandra Kleinová.

Seeds
A champion seed is indicated in bold text while text in italics indicates the round in which that seed was eliminated.

  Yone Kamio (semifinals)
  Kyoko Nagatsuka (first round)
  Mana Endo (second round)
  Ai Sugiyama (second round)
  Shaun Stafford (first round)
  Jana Nejedly (second round)
  Sung-Hee Park (quarterfinals)
  Jolene Watanabe (second round)

Draw

Main draw

References

External links

TVA Cup
TVA Cup - Singles